Marcus G. Smith (born 1973) is president and chief executive officer and director of NASCAR track owner Speedway Motorports, Inc.(SMI) and general manager of SMI owned Charlotte Motor Speedway. He is the son of SMI CEO Bruton Smith.

Background
Marcus Smith attended the University of North Carolina studying to become a doctor, then later a journalist, but did not earn a degree. He started working at Charlotte Motor Speedway during summers as an intern picking up trash, selling tickets and souvenirs, and cutting the grass. Smith slowly began to work his way up the SMI corporate ladder, becoming a sales associate in 1996 and manager of new business development in 1999. In 1999, Smith led talks between SMI and Lowe's Corporation, Inc. to sell the naming rights of Charlotte Motor Speedway. The track was known as Lowe's Motor Speedway until 2009 when a deal could not be reached to extend the contract. He became vice president of business development in 2001, and was made director in 2004. Also in 2004, he became the executive vice president of national sales and marketing for SMI. 

Smith assumed theposition as president, chief operating officer and director of SMI on May 28, 2009 after H.A. "Humpy" Wheeler retired. At the same time, Smith also assumed duties as general manager and president of Charlotte Motor Speedway. When promoted, Smith stated "I'm going to bring the same passion to work each day that the race fans bring to the track every week. I'm competitive, and I want to be sure we're doing everything we can to provide a fantastic motorsports experience to our fans."

References

External links
Official website of Speedway Motorsports

American motorsport people
Auto racing executives
NASCAR people
Businesspeople from Charlotte, North Carolina
Living people
1973 births
American chief operating officers
Charlotte Country Day School alumni
University of North Carolina at Chapel Hill alumni